Norman Thomas may refer to:

 Norman Thomas (1884–1968), American socialist, pacifist and presidential candidate for the Socialist Party of America
 Norman G. Thomas (born 1930), American astronomer
 Norman Thomas (Australian politician) (1894–?), New South Wales politician
 Norman Thomas (broadcaster) (1947/8–2011), British radio personality

See also